The 1964 North Carolina gubernatorial election was held on November 3, 1964. Democratic nominee Dan K. Moore defeated Republican nominee Robert L. Gavin with 56.59% of the vote.

Primary elections
Primary elections were held on May 30, 1964.

Democratic primary

Candidates
Dan K. Moore, former Judge of the North Carolina Superior Court
L. Richardson Preyer, former Judge of the United States District Court for the Middle District of North Carolina
I. Beverly Lake Sr., attorney
Kidd Brewer, businessman and former Appalachian State Mountaineers football coach
Bruce E. Burleson
Raymond J. Stansbury

Results

Republican primary

Candidates
Robert L. Gavin, former United States Attorney for the Middle District of North Carolina
Charles W. Strong, State Senator
Donald Badgley, State Representative

Results

General election

Candidates
Dan K. Moore, Democratic
Robert L. Gavin, Republican

Results

References

1964
North Carolina
Gubernatorial